Foreigner registration is a mandatory requirement by the Government of India under which all foreign nationals (excluding overseas citizens of India) visiting India on a long term visa (more than 180 days) are required to register themselves with a Registration Officer within 14 days of arriving in India. Pakistani nationals visiting India are required to register within 24 hours of arrival regardless of the duration of their stay. Foreign children below the age of 16 are exempt from registration requirements.

Foreign nationals must report in-person to the nearest Registration Officer in their jurisdiction. Persons suffering from medical issues may be exempt from appearing in-person for registration. Foreign registration was mandated and is regulated by the Registration of Foreigners Act, 1939 and the Registration of Foreigners Rules, 1992. Persons who fail to register within the specified time period are charged a late fee of US$30.

Foreign nationals are issued a residential permit at the time of registration. The permit has a validity matching the period of stay specified in the visa.

In April 2018, the Union Government launched the e-FRRO scheme which allows foreigners to register and avail visa and immigration related services online. Under the new scheme, a foreign citizen is no longer required to appear in-person at an FRRO, unless specifically required to do so. Around 360,000 foreign citizens visited FRRO offices across India in 2017.

Registration Officers
Authorities empowered to register foreigners are known as Registration Officers. The Foreigners Regional Registration Officers (FRROs) at Kolkata, Mumbai, New Delhi, Chennai, Amritsar, Bangalore and Hyderabad, and the District Superintendents of Police in all other districts serve as Registration Officers.

Documents required for registration
Valid passport and visa
4 passport size colour photographs (4 cm x 4 cm) with white background, without spectacles or cap/hat
The foreigner registration form
Photocopy of,
The photo page of the passport;
The page displaying validity of the passport;
The page displaying the Indian visa and arrival stamp
 A letter of undertaking and identity document of an Indian sponsor
Proof of residential address in India
Payment of registration fee of 
For employment visas
 Copies of the terms and conditions of the contract of assignment, including salary, designation, and tenure of employment.
For employment or business visas
Copies of PAN card or of application made for grant of PAN card
Forwarding letter of concerned company/firm /business undertaking, signed by an authorised signatory and declaring name, designation, and contact number.
For student visas
Copies of Bonafide certificate from the concerned academic institute mentioning validity of admission and nationality of the student.
For medical visas
Letter from concerned hospital where patient is undergoing treatment and supportive medical documents/diagnostic test reports, and medical certificate declaring estimated length of treatment
 If the applicant is admitted in the hospital, their doctor must provide a medical certificate bearing a photo of the applicant attested and certified by the doctor.

Online registration
Online registration is only available in select cities. Applicants can apply for registration and upload relevant documents online. They may also schedule the date of their in-person appointment with a Registration Officer. Pakistani nationals are not eligible to schedule appointments, and must report to a police station within 24 hours of arriving in India.

e-FRRO is the online portal which involves completely online application submission and document upload, for which no facilitation is required by any intermediary / agents etc. The foreigners are required to apply online. It is advised not to believe any middlemen/agent that claim speedy grant of e-FRRO and charge extra money for it.

Forms obtained at the Foreigners Regional Registration office

Form 'c' - (Rules 5, 6, 7) - Part-IV-Triplicate of Registration report
Not required if using online registration.
You will be given one copy of the form
You will be asked to photo copy 8 copies (before filling in).
You will be asked to fill in 8 copies by hand.
Resident Permit - (Under para 7 of the Foreigner Orders, 1948).
You will be given one copy of the form
You will be asked to photo copy 2 copies (before filling in).
Fill in and sign by hand.

Paying the late fee

The late fee is to be paid by physically going to the State Bank of India, with the late fee payment details form.  The State Bank of India is a state run bank.  To deposit the money you will need,
A photocopy of the payment details form obtained from the Foreigners Regional Registration Office.
1400 rupees in cash.

References

External links
 General Instructions for Registration by the Foreigners - Bureau of Immigration
 Online Registration

Immigration to India